Kom Kola (also Romanized as Kom Kolā, Kam Kala, andKom Kalā; also known as Kūm Kalā and Qum Qal‘eh) is a village in Bala Khiyaban-e Litkuh Rural District, in the Central District of Amol County, Mazandaran Province, Iran. At the 2006 census, its population was 398, in 99 families.

References 

Populated places in Amol County